Michigan Stars may refer to:

Michigan Stars (AAHL), defunct AAHL franchise 
Michigan Stars (Midwest Hockey League), a former member of the Midwest Hockey League
Michigan Stars FC, a professional soccer team in the National Independent Soccer Association